Cambarellus puer is a species of crayfish in the family Cambaridae. It is known commonly as the swamp dwarf crayfish. It is native to the United States, where it can be found in Oklahoma, Texas, Louisiana, Illinois, Arkansas, Mississippi, Tennessee, and Kentucky.

This crayfish lives in a variety of habitat types, including artificial habitats such as roadside ditches. It is generally found with aquatic vegetation, and it burrows into the substrate during dry periods.

It is listed as a least-concern species by the International Union for Conservation of Nature (IUCN), because it is "secure, widespread and abundant".

References

Cambaridae
Endemic fauna of the United States
Freshwater crustaceans of North America
Crustaceans described in 1941
Taxa named by Horton H. Hobbs Jr.